How I Got Lost is a 2009 American film that premiered at the Newport Beach Film Festival, the St. Louis International Film Festival and Austin Film Festival. It was written and directed by Joe Leonard, and stars Aaron Stanford, Jacob Fishel, and Rosemarie DeWitt. The film was scored by Golden Globe award nominated musician Kaki King. It was shot with  the Red camera on location in the East Village, Manhattan and in Kirkwood, Missouri. Unique in its bookending of two transformative events in New York City: the September 11, 2001 attacks and Northeast Blackout of 2003.

Plot
The story involves a young disillusioned banker (Aaron Stanford) as seen through the eyes of his sportswriting best friend (Jacob Fishel), who has emotionally withdrawn since September 11, 2001 and the end of his post-9/11 relationship. When the two decide to leave town, the film becomes a road movie about the hidden gifts of getting lost.

References

External links

2009 films
2009 drama films
American drama films
2000s American films